Lev Konstantinovich Durov (23 December 1931 – 20 August 2015) was a Soviet and Russian theatre and film actor who appeared in more than 200 films and numerous stage productions between 1955 and 2008. He was named a People's Artist of the USSR in 1990.

Durov came from the illustrious Durov family whose members included memoirist Nadezhda Durova and animal trainer Anatoly Durov. His aunt's husband  ran the Maly Theatre in 1944–1947. Lev Durov married actress Irina Kirichenko (1931–2001) in 1954. Their daughter Ekaterina is also an actress.

He joined the troupe of Anatoly Efros in 1954 and was a mainstay of Efros's productions until 1984. For some 30 years, he worked at the  both as an actor and as a director. He was the theatre's principal director from 2003 to 2006.

Durov was also known for his voice acting, most notably as Sharik the Dog in Three from Prostokvashino and its sequels. He published three books of memoirs, in 1999 and 2008. Lev Durov died on 20 August 2015 and was buried at the Novodevichy Cemetery.

Selected filmography
Actor
 Nine Days in One Year (Девять дней одного года, 1962) – KGB officer
 I Step Through Moscow (Я шагаю по Москве, 1963) – police officer
 Lebedev against Lebedev (Лебедев против Лебедева, 1965)
 I'm going to search (Иду искать, 1966)
 All The King's Men (Вся королевская рать, 1971) – Sugar Boy
 Stariki-razboyniki (Старики-разбойники, 1971) – driver
 Bumbarash (Бумбараш, 1971) – miller
 Big School-Break (Большая перемена, 1972) – police sergeant
 A Man at His Place (1972) – Ivan Maksimovich
 We rode the tram Ilf and Petrov (Ехали в трамвае Илья и Петров, 1972) – passerby / Gusev-Lebedev
 Moscow-Cassiopeia (Москва-Кассиопея, 1973) – Academician Filatov
 Seventeen Moments of Spring (Семнадцать мгновений весны, 1973) – agent Klaus
 Ksenia, Fedor's Beloved Wife (Ксения, любимая жена Фёдора, 1974) – Sidorov Teens in the Universe (Отроки во Вселенной, 1974) – Academician Filatov Diamonds for the Dictatorship of the Proletariat (1975) — Pojamchi Armed and Dangerous (Вооружен и очень опасен, 1977) – Lucky Charlie Nose (Нос, 1977) – Polizeimeister The Scarlet Flower (Аленький цветочек, 1977) – Merchant d'Artagnan and Three Musketeers (д'Артаньян и три мушкетёра, 1978) – de Tréville Adjacent-channel Rejection Ratio (1980)
 Farewell (1986) – Pinegin  (Не бойся, я с тобой!, 1981) – San Sanych Express on Fire (1982) — Multya  (1982) — Kirill's father Red Bells (Красные колокола, 1982) — Schreuder The Story of Voyages (Сказка странствий, 1983) – Gorgon the robber The Fourth Year of War (Шёл четвёртый год войны, 1983) – Khomutov  (Пеппи – Длинный чулок, 1984) — Stephensen Success (1984) — Platonov How to Become Happy (1986) – old man-inventor A Man from the Boulevard des Capuchines (Человек с бульвара Капуцинов, 1987) – coffin maker  (Горы дымят, 1989) – Akhilesku Anarchy (Беспредел, 1989)
 Gardes-Marines III (Гардемарины-III, 1992) – Cavalry general Denisov Don't Play the Fool (Не валяй дурака..., 1997) — grandfather Why Wouldn't We Send a Messenger? (1998) – Yakov The Garden Was Full of Moon (Луной был полон сад, 2000) – Grigori PetrovichVoice
 Three from Prostokvashino (1978) – voice of Sharik the dog
 The Fire-Fairy (1979) – the Narrator / the grandfather
 Dog in Boots'' (1981) – voice of Foxhound and Fisherman's dog

References

External links

 

1931 births
2015 deaths
People's Artists of the USSR
People's Artists of the RSFSR
Honored Artists of the RSFSR
Recipients of the Order "For Merit to the Fatherland", 3rd class
Russian male film actors
Russian male stage actors
Russian male voice actors
Soviet male film actors
Soviet male stage actors
Soviet male voice actors
Burials at Novodevichy Cemetery
Male actors from Moscow
Moscow Art Theatre School alumni
Academic staff of Moscow Art Theatre School